One Night at McCool's is a 2001 American neo-noir  black comedy film written by Stan Seidel, directed by Harald Zwart, and starring Liv Tyler, Matt Dillon, Paul Reiser, John Goodman, Michael Douglas, Andrew Silverstein and Reba McEntire.

Plot
The majority of the film consists of Randy, Carl, and Dehling reciting their experiences with Jewel, each narrating over what they consider to be the real version of the recent events. Scenes are often re-enacted twice, with different accounts contradicting each other. Randy believes he's an innocent victim in the whole story while Dehling thinks Randy is a slimy, macho, abusive thug. Carl is convinced that every woman is in love with him and he's a gift to all women.

Randy, a bartender sits down next to Mr. Burmeister at a bingo hall and recounts his story of how he got to where he is. One night while working at McCool's, Randy apparently saves a woman named Jewel from her boyfriend "Utah." Carl, Randy's distant relative who was at McCool's that night, recounts to his therapist that he was sleeping off his drunkenness in his car and saw the altercation but noticed Jewel put on an act afterwards to make Randy take her home. After he takes her to his home and they sleep together, Jewel reveals to Randy that she is a con-woman and Utah arrives shortly thereafter to rob his house. Unfortunately, Randy doesn't have many possessions, so Utah decides to have Randy open the safe at McCool's for its cash. During the robbery, Utah is shot in the head by Jewel and Randy takes the blame for her, claiming self-defense. Detective Dehling (also recounting the past events to his friend; Father Jimmy) investigates the matter accordingly but believes Randy isn't telling the whole truth.

Jewel soon moves in with Randy at his house and begins to purchase new furniture and redecorating the interior of the house, much to Randy's chagrin as he lost his job at McCool's since the owner believes the reputation is worth more than what was in the safe. Also infatuated with Jewel, Dehling begins hearing half of an argument that Randy and Jewel have, causing him to paint Randy as an abusive, overly macho husband to Jewel, despite Randy's pleas that they are not. With Randy not having a job and Jewel continually removing his stuff, save for the snow globes his mother collected, Jewel manipulates Randy to rob his former boss of some sports memorabilia and other items. She later comes home with a different car, saying she was "borrowing it from a friend" and later they pull a scam on one of Carl's associates at his law firm. Unfortunately, the robbery doesn't go as planned and Jewel is forced to kill him with a DVD player while Randy was trapped in a closet. Though they get away, Jewel and Randy continue to fight.

Detective Dehling investigates the murder as he soon finds that Carl is related to Randy. Becoming more infatuated with Jewel, and noticing a black eye on her, Dehling forces Randy out of his own house and cites he'll put a restraining order on Randy. Randy notices Jewel smile from the inside of the house, realizing he's been scammed for everything he has. Dehling later comforts Jewel and they later have sex. Meanwhile, Carl continues with his story that he believed Jewel came onto him at a gathering he held with his family, Randy, and Jewel, which Carl was happy to oblige as he was having marital problems. Back at the bingo hall, Randy finishes his story to Burmeister and they both leave and head to a distant motel where Randy gives him $10,000 to kill Jewel. Randy calls Carl from the motel and Carl is excited to hear since he wants to experience sex with Jewel again. Arriving at the house, Carl puts on some bondage outfits while Detective Dehling arrives in his uniform with flowers. Randy tries to warn Carl to stay away from his house, but has to steal a car to make sure Burmeister doesn't kill Carl as well. As they all converge in the house and an argument erupts with each person claiming to be Jewel's boyfriend, Utah's twin brother Elmo asking who killed his brother. Burmeister is watching from outside when Jewel catches him by surprise. Both infatuated with each other, the two decide to leave when Elmo fires at them and a shootout begins. Carl escapes on foot while both Elmo and Dehling die from gunshots. Randy survives unscathed but steeps in the destruction in his house.

Jewel gets in Burmeister's car which he tells her of his house, big screen TV, and DVD player; all things that she has ever wanted and leaves the last snow globe on the sidewalk before driving away. Carl continues his escape until he is nearly hit by a car and he rejoices briefly before being crushed by a dumpster.

Cast
 Matt Dillon as Randy
 Liv Tyler as Jewel
 Paul Reiser as Carl
 John Goodman as Detective Dehling
 Michael Douglas as Mr. Burmeister
 Andrew Silverstein as Utah / Elmo
 Reba McEntire as Dr. Green
 Richard Jenkins as Father Jimmy
 Leo Rossi as Joey Dinardo
 Andrea Bendewald as Karen
 Sandy Martin as Bingo vendor woman
 Helen Hunt (deleted scenes) as Truck Driver

Production
Writer Stan Seidel, who died prior to the film's release, drew much of the film's material from Randy Dana's days as a bartender at Humphrey's Restaurant & Tavern, a college bar located in the midst of St. Louis University.

Home Video
The film was released on VHS and DVD on October 9, 2001 by USA Home Entertainment.

Reception

Box office
The film disappointed monetarily, grossing $13.5 million out of its $18 million budget in theatrical release.

Critical reception
The film garnered mixed to poor reviews.  

Roger Ebert saying in a 2½ star review that the film "is so busy with its crosscut structure and its interlocking stories that it never really gives us anyone to identify with" but that "it has a lot of fun being a near miss."

References

External links
 
 
 
 
 

2001 films
2001 black comedy films
2000s crime comedy films
American black comedy films
2000s Spanish-language films
Films directed by Harald Zwart
Fiction with unreliable narrators
Films set in Missouri
Films set in St. Louis
Films shot in California
Films shot in Los Angeles
Films produced by Michael Douglas
Films scored by Marc Shaiman
2001 comedy films
USA Films films
2000s English-language films
2000s American films
2001 multilingual films
American multilingual films